The 2019 HEC O'Connor Cup was won by University of Limerick who defeated UCD by 2–16 to 1–10 in the final. Six teams were invited to take part in the competition. Queen's University and UCC reached the semi-finals while DCU defeated NUI Galway by 3–18 to 0–6 to win the Michael O'Connor Shield.

Group stage
Six teams were invited to take part in the 2019 O'Connor Cup. They were drawn into two groups of three. UCD, Queen's University and NUI Galway were placed in Group A while University of Limerick, UCC and DCU, were placed in Group B. Each group played three rounds of games during  February. The top two teams from each group qualified for the O'Connor Cup semi-finals. The two third placed teams played off for the O'Connor Shield.

Group A

Final table

Group B

Final table

O'Connor Cup Weekend
The O'Connor Shield play off, the two O'Connor Cup semi-finals and the final all formed part of the O'Connor Cup Weekend which was hosted by DIT GAA and the GAA Centre of Excellence in Abbotstown. The final was streamed live by TG4 on their YouTube channel.

Semi-finals

O'Connor Shield

Final

References

2019 in Ladies' Gaelic football
February 2019 sports events in Europe
March 2019 sports events in Europe